Onychoprion, the "brown-backed terns", is a genus of seabirds in the family Laridae.

Species
Although the genus was first described in 1832 by Johann Georg Wagler the four species in the genus were until 2005 retained in the larger genus Sterna, the genus that holds most terns.

Three of the four species are tropical, and one has a sub-polar breeding range. The sooty tern has a pan-tropical distribution; the bridled tern also breeds across the Tropical Atlantic and Indian Ocean but in the central Pacific it is replaced by the spectacled tern. The Aleutian tern breeds around Alaska and Siberia but winters in the tropics around South East Asia.

Manutara is the Rapa Nui language name for spectacled and sooty terns. Both arrive at Easter Island and hatch their eggs on the island called Motu Nui, an event that was used for an annual rite called Tangata manu.

References

 
Bird genera
Terns